The false boarfish (Neocyttus helgae) is a species of fish in the family Oreosomatidae (oreos).

Description
It has 6–7 dorsal spines, 34–35 dorsal soft rays, 3–4 anal spines and 31–32 anal soft rays. It is diamond-shaped, with a protruding small mouth and large spiny rays present at the anterior edges of the fins.

Habitat

Behaviour

The false boarfish feeds off zooplankton and raises its dorsal spine as a territorial display. It feeds near to Paragorgia coral.

References

Oreosomatidae
Fish described in 1908
Taxa named by Ernest William Lyons Holt